Wilhelm Frass (29 May 1886 – 1 November 1968) was an Austrian sculptor. His work was part of the sculpture event in the art competition at the 1936 Summer Olympics.

References

1886 births
1968 deaths
20th-century Austrian sculptors
Austrian male sculptors
Olympic competitors in art competitions
People from Sankt Pölten
20th-century Austrian male artists